The 2013 Southland Conference tournament was held at Lady Demon Diamond on the campus of Northwestern State University in Natchitoches, Louisiana, from May 9 through 11, 2013. The tournament winner, Northwestern State earned the Southland Conference's automatic bid to the 2013 NCAA Division I softball tournament. Early rounds of the tournament were broadcast on the Southland Conference Digital Network. Both games of the championship round were carried on ESPN3, with Chris Mycoskie and Tony Taglavore on the call.

Format
The top 6 teams qualified for the Southland softball tournament.  The tournament was played using a double elimination format and included the maximum number of games in the format since a second game on championship day was required.

Tournament

All times listed are Central Daylight Time.

Line Scores

Day One

Game 1 (Central Arkansas vs Lamar)

Game 2 (Southeastern Louisiana vs Sam Houston State)

Game 3 (Central Arkansas vs McNeese State)

Game 4 (Northwestern State vs Sam Houston State)

Day Two

Game 5 (McNeese State vs Southeastern Louisiana)

Game 6 (Sam Houston State vs Lamar)

Game 7 (Northwestern State vs Central Arkansas)

Semi-final Game One (Southeastern Louisiana vs Sam Houston State)

Semi-final Game Two (Sam Houston State vs Central Arkansas)

Day Three

Championship Game One (Sam Houston State vs Northwestern State)

Championship Game Two (Northwestern State vs Sam Houston State)

Awards and honors
Source:  

Tournament MVP: Kylie Roos - Northwestern State

All-Tournament Teams:

 Kim Damian - Sam Houston State
 Alyssa Coggins - Sam Houston State
 Shelbi Tucker - Sam Houston State
 Tara McKenney - Northwestern State
 Ashley Isbell - Sam Houston State
 Cassandra Barefield - Northwestern State
 Kelsey Nichols - Southeastern Louisiana
 Tori Benavidez - Sam Houston State
 Sam Forrest - Central Arkansas
 Kelsie Armstrong - Central Arkansas
 Shelby Lancaster - Sam Houston State

See also
2013 Southland Conference baseball tournament

References

Southland Conference softball tournament
Tournament